, also known as Kimihide Tokudaiji, is a Japanese art critic and aristocrat who was the head of the Tokudaiji family.

Biography 
Kinhide Tokudaiji was born on 2 November 1919 in Tokyo as the eldest son of Prince Saneatsu Tokudaiji and Yoneko Tokudaiji. Yoneko was from the Matsudaira family and was the daughter of Count Naoyuki Matsudaira.

Tokudaiji studied political science at the Tokyo Imperial University, graduating in 1945.

Tokudaiji was one of the founding members of Kōbō Abe's Kiroku Geijutsu no Kai. Besides teaching at Gakushuin University, he was also commissioned by the Bridgestone Museum of Art.

References

External links 
 

1919 births
Possibly living people
Japanese art critics
Tokudaiji family
University of Tokyo alumni